William Oliver Hamilton (March 29, 1876 – December 29, 1951) was an American basketball coach, track coach, and college athletics administrator.  He served as the third head basketball coach at the University of Kansas, coaching the Jayhawks from 1909 to 1919. Under Hamilton Kansas had its first All-Americans Tommy Johnson (1909), Ralph Sproull (1915), and Dutch Lonborg (1919) who would later be a member of the Basketball Hall of Fame. Before coaching at Kansas, Hamilton was the coach at Central High School in Kansas City at the time Casey Stengel future member of the Baseball Hall of Fame was attending and played basketball as well as baseball. His basketball team won the city championship.

Hamilton later worked as a car dealer in Lawrence, Kansas.  He died there of December 29, 1951 at the age of 75.

Head coaching record

Basketball

References

1876 births
1951 deaths
American men's basketball coaches
Basketball coaches from Missouri
Kansas Jayhawks athletic directors
Kansas Jayhawks men's basketball coaches
People from Huntsville, Missouri
William Jewell Cardinals men's basketball coaches
College track and field coaches in the United States